The Tschingelspitz is a mountain of the Bernese Alps, located south of Mürren in the Bernese Oberland. It lies east of the higher Gspaltenhorn.

References

External links
 Tschingelspitz on Hikr

Bernese Alps
Mountains of the Alps
Alpine three-thousanders
Mountains of Switzerland
Mountains of the canton of Bern